John Arthur Cunliffe (16 June 1933 – 20 September 2018) was an English children's book author and television presenter who created the characters of Postman Pat and Rosie and Jim.

Biography
Cunliffe was born in Colne, Lancashire, the only child of Nelly and Arthur Cunliffe. His father left the family when John was a baby. His great-uncle Herbert introduced him to the literary works of Charles Dickens and William Shakespeare, and let him use the microscope he kept in his front room. Cunliffe was very tall for his age, and bullied at school because of this. He attended Colne Grammar School, and later lived in Kendal, Westmorland, where the area's small towns and villages provided inspiration for his most famous character, Postman Pat. 'Greendale', where Cunliffe's character and series are set, are based on the valley of Longsleddale, near Kendal. Cunliffe worked for many years as a librarian, and also as a teacher at Castle Park Primary School.

Cunliffe was commissioned by the BBC to write Postman Pat, which was produced by Ivor Wood and first aired in 1981. He created Pat and Greendale as an idyllic village where everyone was nice to each other, in contrast to the bullying he suffered while growing up. Following the success of Postman Pat, Cunliffe became something of a local celebrity, and had a room dedicated to him at Kendal's Museum of Lakeland Life.

In the 1990s, Cunliffe's other well-known creation, Rosie and Jim, was also written for television. He scripted and presented the first 50 episodes, then turned some of them into books. He intended to create a series closer to what he wanted overall, after being disappointed by some of the merchandising and tie-in books for Postman Pat, over which he had little control. His role as presenter was taken over by Pat Hutchins in 1995, and later by Neil Brewer in 1997.

In 2010, he released Ghosts, a children's story for the iPad. He was patron of the Ilkley Literature Festival.

Cunliffe died of cardiopulmanory failure on 20 September 2018, at the age of 85. His death was first announced in the local newspaper, the Ilkley Gazette, which said he "left his Ilkley home in a deluge of rain [...] never to return".

VHS videos and DVDs

My Favourite Nursery Rhymes

References

External links

John Cunliffe at the British Film Institute

1933 births
2018 deaths
English children's writers
People from Colne
People from Kendal